Lidcombe Oval is a playing field and velodrome in the Western Sydney suburb of Lidcombe. It is part of Wyatt Park. It is situated in the Western side of Church Street, on the northern side of the railway line. The outfield  has a capacity of more than 20,000 spectators. The infield is used mainly for football matches of various codes. The velodrome hosts track cycling events and has been the home of Lidcombe-Auburn Cycle Club since 1947, and Neo Cycling Club since 2015.

Ground & Track Use

Rugby League 

In the NSWRL competition, the ground was home of the Western Suburbs Magpies rugby league team from 1967 to 1986, before the club moved to Campbelltown Stadium in 1987. The attendance record for the ground is 21,015, set in 1978 for a club match between Wests and local rival Parramatta. The Magpies moved from the ground after the 1986 NSWRL season to Campbelltown Stadium due to deteriorating quality of the facilities at the ground as well as a chance to claim a vast amount of junior rugby league players in the south-western suburbs.  The final ever first grade game to be played at Lidcombe Oval was on 31 August 1986 between Western Suburbs and Easts.  Easts won the match 8–6 in front of 7,375 people.

Today, Lidcombe Oval was used as the home ground of the Auburn Warriors up until the end of 2018 before the club was dissolved.  The Western Suburbs Magpies for the last 3–4 seasons have played 1–2 home games a year at the ground as part of the "Return to Lidcombe' celebrations.

In 2017, Western Suburbs played against St Mary's in both the Sydney Shield and Ron Massey Cup matches at the ground to honor their connection with Lidcombe Oval.

On 26 May 2018, Western Suburbs played against Newtown in the "Return to Lidcombe" match.  Newtown came from 18 points down in the second half to defeat Wests 23–22.

In March 2019, Lidcombe Oval hosted 2 Canterbury Cup NSW matches that featured fellow foundation clubs Newtown and North Sydney.  Both games were broadcast live on Channel 9.

In November 2020, Western Suburbs announced that they would be returning to the ground more frequently in 2021, which included using the oval as their primary home ground as opposed to Campbelltown Stadium.

Cycling 

Originally designed and commissioned by champion Commonwealth Sprinter and LACC member Grant Pye in the early 1930s, and used by the NSW League of Wheelmen for a number of years. It was sometime before amateur clubs and the NSW Cyclist Union were allowed to compete on the track. LACC held their first races at nearby Coleman park in 1927 and moved into the Lidcombe Oval Velodrome in 1947.

Lidcombe Oval is one of the last three remaining outdoor velodromes in the Greater Sydney Region including Hurstville Oval and Canterbury (AKA Tempe) Velodrome. A fourth outdoor velodrome remains at Merrylands however it has fallen into disrepair.

All year round the cycling track is used by a number of cycling clubs on most days for weekly training and racing. It has been home to Lidcombe-Auburn Cycle Club (LACC) since 1947 and Neo Cycling Club (Neo CC)  since 2015. Until 2020, the cycling clubs had six bookings a week in summer and four in winter, however with the return of Rugby League in the minor grades, cycling has been reduced to two bookings per week over winter.

Initially a juniors club, Neo Cycling Club quickly became the largest junior cycling club in Australia. In 2020 Neo Cycling Club opened its membership to adults and quickly attracted more track cyclists than any other Sydney club. Neo use the track in the Winter season for training purposes, and both training and racing in the Summer season.

The Velodrome is also used to host the Cycling NSW Junior Metropolitan Track Championships and the InterSchool Cycling Track Student Championships.

References

 

Sports venues in Sydney
Rugby league stadiums in Australia
Rugby union stadiums in Australia
Soccer venues in Sydney
Western Suburbs Magpies
Lidcombe, New South Wales